Ben Temple (born 1969) is an American-born actor who has developed his career in Spain.

Biography 
Ben Temple was born in 1969 in New York. After moving to Spain in 1991, he installed permanently in the country in 1999. In 2003, he married actress Alicia Borrachero, whom with he has had one child. He has developed a film and television career in Spain, including performances in series such as Policías, en el corazón de la calle, El comisario, Amar en tiempos revueltos, Cazadores de hombres, Crematorio, Hospital Central, Víctor Ros, El Ministerio del Tiempo and The Refugees and films such as Carol's Journey, The Galíndez File, Romasanta, REC, The Kovak Box and The Ignorance of Blood.

Filmography

Film

Television

Accolades

References 

1969 births
American male television actors
American male film actors
21st-century Spanish male actors
Spanish male television actors
Spanish male film actors
American emigrants to Spain
Living people